Gölcük Barbaros Hayrettin High School, is a public high school in Gölcük, Kocaeli, Turkey. The school is named after Ottoman admiral Hayreddin Barbarossa.

Short form of the school name is GBHL. Formed in 1958 as "Gölcük Lisesi" (GL), the high school named as "Barbaros Hayrettin Lisesi" in 1970 when it moved to its own building from the provisional location.

The colors of the school are black (symbolizing the deadly ferry accident on 1 March 1958 in which hundreds of high school students died in Gulf of İzmit) and yellow (symbolizing the sun/GBHL rising after this disaster).

In the devastating earthquake epicentered in Gölcük on 17 August 1999, GBHL lost many of its students and faculty residing in Gölcük and surrounding towns. 

The buildings of the high school has been damaged, however later been repaired by the efforts of its alumni association and some international relief organizations.

Notable graduates

 Hikmet Karaman / Football manager
 Ayhan Bölükbaşı / Journalist
 Erdoğan Arıkan / TV presenter
 Şengül Balıksırtı / Journalist
 Demet Akalın / Pop singer
 Sefa Sirmen / Politician
 Haluk Kaplanoğlu / Warner Bross Turkey, CEO
 İlker Yasin* / TV presenter
 Ahmet Özhan* / Turkish court music singer
 Toygar Işıklı* / Composer

Sister schools 

 Robert College, Istanbul
 Koç Lisesi, Istanbul
 Het Bredero College, Amsterdam

External links 
 GBHL Official site
 GBHL Alumni database 
 BarSayfa (GBHL Alumni Blog)
 GBHL Alumni Facebook page

References 

Kocaeli Province
Educational institutions established in 1958
High schools in Turkey
Buildings and structures in Kocaeli Province
1958 establishments in Turkey